Terrell Creek or Terril Creek is a stream in the "western panhandle" of Christian County in the Ozarks of southwest Missouri.

Terrell Creek has the name of the local Terril family.

See also
List of rivers of Missouri

References

Rivers of Christian County, Missouri
Rivers of Missouri